Karapetyan's government was the governing body of Armenia from September 2016 until April 2018. Karen Karapetyan was designated prime minister by President Serzh Sargsyan on 13 September 2016.

It was a coalition government formed by two parliamentary groups: the Republicans and Revolutionary Federation.

The cabinet consisted of eighteen ministries and eight adjunct bodies. Each ministry is responsible for elaborating and implementing governmental decisions in its respective sphere.

Structure

Ministries

Adjunct bodies 
The role of adjunct bodies is to elaborate, implement and administer governmental decision in respective sphere. Similar to ministries, adjunct bodies are subordinate to Prime Minister. There are eight adjunct bodies to Armenian government.

References 

Politics of Armenia
Political organizations based in Armenia
Government of Armenia
European governments